Lucina Q. Uddin is an American cognitive neuroscientist who is a professor at the University of California, Los Angeles. Her research investigates the relationship between brain connectivity and cognition in typical and atypical development using network neuroscience approaches.

Early life and education 
Uddin was born in Bangladesh. Her parents immigrated with her to the United States when she was less than one year old, and Uddin spent her childhood in Southern California. She was an undergraduate student at the University of California, Los Angeles, where she majored in neuroscience and minored in philosophy. She stayed at UCLA for graduate school, where she explored neural correlates of self-recognition working with Eran Zaidel and Marco Iacoboni. During her graduate studies she worked alongside Susan Y. Bookheimer and Mirella Dapretto on neuroimaging studies to better understand autism spectrum disorder. She moved to New York as a postdoctoral scholar, where she worked with Francisco Xavier Castellanos in the Child Study Center. In 2008 she continued her postdoctoral studies at Stanford University, where she worked in the research group of Vinod Menon.

Research and career 
Uddin was Associate Professor in the Cognitive and Behavioral Neuroscience Division which she created in the Department of Psychology at the University of Miami. She directs the Brain Connectivity and Cognition Laboratory, which makes use of neuroimaging to better understand the relationship between neural connectivity and cognition. At the University of Miami, Uddin established a graduate program in cognitive and behavioral neuroscience. In 2018, she was appointed a CIFAR Azrieli Global Scholar. Her current research examines brain network dynamics and cognitive flexibility in neurodevelopmental disorders.

Uddin returned to University of California, Los Angeles in 2021, where she was appointed Professor and co-director of the Center for Cognitive Neuroscience Analysis Core at the Semel Institute for Neuroscience and Behavior. Her lab uses resting state fMRI and diffusion tensor imaging data to examine large-scale brain networks, and how these networks support executive function.

Awards and honors 
 2013 International Society for Autism Research Slifka Award
 2015 Brain & Behavior Research Foundation NARSAD Young Investigator Grant
2015 NIMH Biobehavioral Research Award for Innovative New Scientists
 2017 Organization for Human Brain Mapping Young Investigator Award
 2017 USERN Prize in Medical sciences
2018 Canadian Institute for Advanced Research Azrieli Global Scholar - Brain, Mind & Consciousness Program
2021 Organization for Human Brain Mapping Diversity & Inclusivity Champion Award

Selected publications

Books

References 

Bangladeshi scholars
University of California, Los Angeles alumni
University of California, Los Angeles faculty
American women neuroscientists
Bangladeshi emigrants to the United States
21st-century women physicians
21st-century American women
Year of birth missing (living people)
Living people